Gurnigel Pass (el. 1608 m.) is a high mountain pass in the canton of Bern in Switzerland.

It connects Riggisberg and Zollhaus. The culminating point of the road lies on the eastern flank of the Selibüel.

The pass is the venue for an annual cross-country skiing race.

See also
 List of highest paved roads in Europe
 List of mountain passes
List of the highest Swiss passes

Mountain passes of Switzerland
Mountain passes of the canton of Bern